Pelatachinini is a tribe of flies in the family Tachinidae.

Genera
Pelatachina Meade, 1894

References

Brachyceran flies of Europe
Brachycera tribes
Tachininae